Kenneth "Ken" Hamilton English (9 January 1927 – 24 February 2016) was a New Zealand rugby league footballer who played in the 1950s.

Playing career
A New Zealand Police officer, English switched codes from rugby union in the later 1940s, joining the St. George club in the Wellington Rugby League.

In 1947 English was part of the Wellington side that defeated the West Coast 11–4 to win the Northern Union Cup for the first time. In 1949 he was part of the Southern Provinces team that held the touring Australian side to 17–15.

International honours
After a brilliant trial, English made his New Zealand national rugby league team debut against the 1951 touring French side. With teammate Johnny Dodd, English was selected on the 1951-1952 tour of Great Britain and France. He played in 14 games on the tour, scoring three tries, but never played another test match.

Later years
English later served on the Wellington Rugby League board and was involved in acquiring Rugby League Park for Wellington. He was awarded life membership of both the Wellington Rugby League and the New Zealand Rugby League.

English died in Masterton on 24 February 2016.

References

1927 births
2016 deaths
New Zealand national rugby league team players
New Zealand rugby league players
Place of birth missing
Rugby league props
Rugby league second-rows
Wellington rugby league team players
New Zealand police officers
St. George Saints players
New Zealand rugby league administrators